Zero is both the digit 0 and the number 0.

Zero or Zeros may also refer to:

Arts, entertainment and media

Comics
 Zero (Marvel Comics), several characters in the Marvel Comics Universe
 Zero (manhwa), a Korean manhwa by Dall-Young Lim and Park Sung-woo
 Zero Zero (comics), an alternative comics anthology from 1995 to 2000
 Kenshiro "Zero" Cochrane, a character in Ghost Rider 2099
 Zero, a 2015 Image Comics publication
 Zero, a character in Beetle Bailey

Film and television
 Zero (1928 film), a British silent drama film
 Zero (2009 film), a Polish action film
 Zero (2010 film), a stop-motion animation film
 Zero (2016 film), an Indian fantasy horror film
 Zero (2018 film), an Indian comedy film
 Zero (2021 TV series), an Italian TV series
 Zero (Singaporean TV series), a 2004 drama
 "Zero", a Smallville episode
 Zero (Hit the Floor character), from the TV series Hit the Floor
 Ultraman Zero, a character in Ultra Series
Zero, the titular character in the miniseries Grimoire of Zero, and a supporting one in its five-year spinoff The Dawn of the Witch
 Zero, a supporting character from the 2020 anime Yashahime: Princess Half-Demon
 Zero, a character from the 2021 animated  series Tear Along the Dotted Line
 Zero, a character from the film John Wick: Chapter 3 – Parabellum

Games
 Zero (Drakengard), a character in the role-playing game Drakengard 3
 Zero (Mega Man), a character in Capcom's Mega Man video game franchise
 Major Zero, a character in the Metal Gear video game franchise
 ZeRo (gamer), the gamertag of Gonzalo Barrios, a former professional Super Smash Bros. player
 Zero, a recurring role in the Zero Escape series
 Zero (game engine), created by Pandemic Studios

Magazines
 Zero (video game magazine), a UK monthly magazine from 1989 to 1992
 Zero Magazine (music magazine), in San Francisco
 Zero (Spanish magazine), a Spanish gay-themed magazine

Music

Bands
 Zero (American band), a psychedelic rock band
 Zero (Brazilian band), a 1980s rock band
 Zero (Indian band), a rock band
 Zero Band, a Chinese rock band formed in 1998
 The Zeros (American band), a California punk rock band
 The Zeros (English band), a British punk band

Albums
 Zero (Hawthorne Heights album), 2013
 Zero (KYPCK album), 2016
 Zeros (Declan McKenna album), 2020
 Zeros (The Soft Moon album), 2012

Songs
 "Zero" (Bump of Chicken song) (2011)
 "Zero" (Chris Brown song) (2015)
 "Zero" (B'z song) (1992)
 "Zero" (Fayray song) (2007)
 "Zero" (Hawk Nelson song) (2006)
 "Zero" (Imagine Dragons song) (2018)
 "Zero" (Mahmood song) (2021)
 "Zero" (Alastair Riddell song) (1981)
 "Zero" (The Smashing Pumpkins song) (1996)
 "Zero" (Yeah Yeah Yeahs song) (2009)
 "Zero", a song from the 1992 album Souls at Zero by Neurosis
 "ZERO", a song from the 2002 album Gaia by Janne Da Arc

Other arts, entertainment and media
 Zero (art), an international art movement; also the ZERO foundation, a German cultural institute supported by some Zero artists

Cars
 Dome Zero, a 1978 concept car
 Fiat Zero, produced from 1912 to 1915
 Lancia Stratos Zero, first shown to the public at the Turin Motor Show in 1970
 Nikola Zero, a cancelled off-road side-by-side concept car

Companies
 Zero Halliburton, a luggage company previously known as the Zero Corporation
 Zero Motorcycles, an electric motorcycle company
 Zero Skateboards, a company started by Jamie Thomas

Computing
 AlphaGo Zero, edition of the Go software AlphaGo developed by DeepMind
 /dev/zero a special file in Unix-like operating systems that outputs zeros
 Zero client, a variant of thin client, a type of computer

Mathematics
 Zero of a function, an element of the domain of a function, where the value of the function is zero
 Zero (complex analysis), a zero of a holomorphic function
 Zero element, generalization of the number zero in algebraic structures 
 Zero object (algebra),  generalization of the number zero in algebraic structures 
 Zero object in a category
 Zero dagger (denoted 0†), a particular subset of the natural numbers 
 Zero sharp (denoted 0#), a theoretical number relating to the consistency of set theory
 Zero: The Biography of a Dangerous Idea, a book by Charles Seife

Places
 Zero, Mississippi, an unincorporated community
 Zero, Montana, an unincorporated community
 Zero Township, Adams County, Nebraska

Other uses
 Zero, common marketing name for Diet drinks
 Mitsubishi A6M Zero, a Japanese fighter aircraft used in World War II
 Zero (name), a surname, given name, or pseudonym
 Zero (linguistics), an element unrealized in speech, as in a zero article
 Zero (Sapphire and Steel), an audio drama
 ZERO bar, a candy bar manufactured by the Hershey Company
 ZERO—The End of Prostate Cancer, a non-profit organization
 Zero Emission Resource Organisation, a Norwegian environmental organization
 In shooting sports, the default center of aim after sighting in (or "zeroing") a gun

See also

 Zeero, a Tru64 UNIX command/utility
 Ziro, a town in India
 Ziro Province, in Burkina Faso
 0 (disambiguation)
 Xero (disambiguation)
 Zero order (disambiguation)